The dogtooth herring (Chirocentrodon bleekerianus) is a species of herring occurring in the Caribbean Sea and the Atlantic Ocean along the coast of northern South America, Central America and the Caribbean islands. It is the only species in its genus.  They are commonly around 3.5 inches (9 cm) in length.

References

dogtooth herring
Fish of the Caribbean
dogtooth herring